Mame Diodio Diouf (born 15 December 1984) is a Senegalese women's basketball player.

Career
She began her career in DUC, the university club of Dakar. She was voted Queen of the Season 2005–2006 for her play with the club of DUC.

She played professionally in Switzerland. There, she started with the Esperance club with which she won the Cup of the League. She later joined Arnold-Reymond.

References

External links

Senegalese women's basketball players
1984 births
Living people
Basketball players from Dakar
Serer sportspeople
Senegalese expatriate basketball people in Spain
Senegalese expatriate basketball people in Switzerland
Basketball players at the 2016 Summer Olympics
Olympic basketball players of Senegal
African Games gold medalists for Senegal
African Games medalists in basketball
Point guards
Competitors at the 2007 All-Africa Games